South Burlingame is a neighborhood in the Southwest section of Portland, Oregon. It is bordered by Multnomah to the west, Hillsdale and South Portland to the north, the River View Cemetery to the east, and Markham, Marshall Park, and Collins View to the south.

Interstate 5 cuts through the northern part of the neighborhood, separating the Fulton Park area from the rest of South Burlingame.

History
South Burlingame was formed on June 7, 1910 when B.M. Lombard, in partnership with Fulton Park Land Company, recorded a replat to a  section of land that was, at the time, a part of the Fulton Park District.

It included the present-day South Burlingame neighborhood as well as an eight-block corridor of land that follows Terwilliger Boulevard north from Interstate 5 to Capital Highway.

Prior to 1888, the original land was part of the Thomas F. Stephens donation land claim and was purchased from him in two separate transactions in 1858 and 1868.

Parks
Burlingame Park (1949)
Fulton Park (1941), including Fulton Park Community Center (built 1914 as an elementary school, acquired by Portland Parks and Recreation in 1958) and Fulton Community Garden and Display Garden (1974)

References

External links
Guide to South Burlingame Neighborhood (southburlingamena.org)

Neighborhoods in Portland, Oregon
1910 establishments in Oregon